Daniel Beirne (born August 12, 1982) is a Canadian actor. He is most noted for his performance as Mackenzie King in the 2019 film The Twentieth Century, for which he won the Vancouver Film Critics Circle award for Best Actor in a Canadian Film at the Vancouver Film Critics Circle Awards 2019 and was a Canadian Screen Award nominee for Best Actor at the 8th Canadian Screen Awards.

He also starred in the films Great Great Great, Suck It Up, and I Like Movies. He has had television roles as Sonny Greer in Fargo, Gary Goldman in Workin' Moms, Tommy in The Guest Book, and the Drive-Thru Guy in Humour Resources, and appeared in the web series Space Riders: Division Earth, The Bitter End, Dad Drives, Ghost BFF and Detention Adventure.

He won a Canadian Screen Award in 2015 as a co-creator and producer of Space Riders: Division Earth, and has won two Canadian Comedy Awards as a writer and creator of Dad Drives and Space Riders: Division Earth.

He has also previously been a music writer and editor of the blog Said the Gramophone, selected by Time magazine as one of the 25 best blogs in the world in 2009.

Filmography

Film

References

External links

1982 births
21st-century Canadian male actors
Canadian male film actors
Canadian male television actors
Canadian male web series actors
Canadian bloggers
Living people
Canadian Screen Award winners
Canadian Comedy Award winners
Male actors from Ottawa